183 Club is a Taiwanese boyband managed by Jungiery. In other words, 183 Club is part of J-Star.  Originally they were called "183 Yu Le Bu," meaning "183 Entertainment Group," but it was later decided that the name should be shortened to what it is now: 183 Club.  The average height of the original five members combined is roughly 183 cm, hence the group name 183 Club.  However, it is true that only one member is actually 183 cm tall: Yen Hsing-su, the former leader of 183 Club.

They have acted in various Taiwanese dramas such as Magicians of Love, The Prince Who Turns into a Frog and Le Robe de Mariage des Cieux.

The group's Magicians of Love Original Soundtrack won Best Original Soundtrack at the 2007 HITO Radio Music Awards, presented by Taiwanese radio station Hit FM.

Members

Current

Former

Filmography
 My MVP Valentine (2002)
 Westside Story (2003)
 Top on Forbidden City (2004)
 In Love With A Rich Girl (2004)
  (Heaven's Wedding Gown) (2004)
 The Prince Who Turns into a Frog (2005)
 The Magicians of Love (2006)
 Legend of Star Apple (2006)
 Angel Lover (2006)
 Rocks Paper Scissors (2006)
 Ying Ye 3 Jia 1 (2007)
 Mean Girl A Chu (2007)
 Your Home is My Home (2007)

Discography

  (Heaven's Wedding Gown) OST (2004)
 The Prince Who Turns into a Frog OST (2005)
 The Magicians of Love OST (2006)
 The First Album (2006)
 Angel Lover OST (2007)
 Love Miracle 1
 Love Miracle 2
 Love Miracle 3

External links
 Official website

References

Taiwanese boy bands
Mandopop musical groups